27 Pashons - Coptic calendar - 29 Pashons

Fixed commemorations
All fixed commemorations below are observed on 28 Pashons (5 June) by the Coptic Orthodox Church.

Commemorations
 Relocation of the relics of Saint Epiphanius, Bishop of Salamis in Cyprus (119 A.M.), (403 A.D.)

References
Coptic Synexarion

Days of the Coptic calendar